Nesar-e Eskandari (also Romanized as Nesār-e Eskandarī; also known as Eskandarī-ye Nesā‘, Nesār, and Nisār) is a village in Zayandeh Rud-e Shomali Rural District, in the Central District of Faridan County, Isfahan Province, Iran. At the 2006 census, its population was 682, in 162 families.

References 

Populated places in Faridan County